Lot 54 is a township in Kings County, Prince Edward Island, Canada.  It is part of St. George's Parish. In the 1767 land lottery, Lot 54 was awarded to Robert Adair, surgeon to King George III of the United Kingdom.

References

54
Geography of Kings County, Prince Edward Island